João Cristino da Silva (14 July 1829, Lisbon - 12 May 1877, Lisbon) was a Portuguese painter and illustrator in the Romantic style.

Biography 
He was born into a merchant family and began his studies at the Academy of Fine Arts of the University of Lisbon in 1841, but was known for being temperamental, taking issue with his instructor, António Manuel da Fonseca, and the school's teaching methods, so he left in 1847 without completing his courses. From 1847 to 1849 he worked as an engraver at the "Arsenal do Exército" (Army Arsenal). He then returned to painting.

Soon he began to exhibit, in Paris and Madrid as well as Portugal. He was mainly known as a landscape painter and often worked with Tomás da Anunciação, who he considered to be his true teacher. At the Exposition Universelle (1855), he exhibited what is probably his best-known work "Cinco Artistas em Sintra" (Five Artists at Sintra), which was later purchased by King Ferdinand II. After a showing in Madrid, he was knighted by King Amadeo I.

In 1860, he became a substitute Professor at the Academy, but abandoned the post in 1867 because of continuing disagreements with the administration. That year, he received a travel subsidy; visiting France and Switzerland. He also collaborated in providing illustrations for the weekly magazine , which was published from 1857 to 1868.

References

Further reading
 Maria de Aires Silveira,  João Cristino da Silva (1829-1877) (exhibition catalog) Museu do Chiado  2000
 Diogo de Macedo, João Cristino da Silva e Manuel Maria Bordalo Pinheiro (Vol.5 of "Cadernos de Arte") Edições Excelsior 1952

External links 

 João Cristino da Silva e o tema da paisagem na literatura portuguesa de meados do século XIX (Silva and the landscape theme in mid-nineteenth century Portuguese literature) by Helena Carvalhão Buescu at the University of Lisbon 
 An album of sketches by Silva @ Flickr

1829 births
1877 deaths
People from Lisbon
Landscape painters
19th-century Portuguese painters
Portuguese male painters
19th-century male artists